Rudolph Hoenger (1878–1952) was a pioneer Australian rugby league footballer who played in the 1900s.

Hoegner (known as Kurt Henger) played in the first ever Newtown team, the first game was played against Eastern Suburbs on 20 April 1908 at Wentworth Park. Hoenger had a background in Rugby Union, and played only one season before retiring.   

Hoenger died at Cabramatta, New South Wales on 8 August 1952, age 74.

References

1878 births
1952 deaths
Australian people of German descent
Australian rugby league players
Rugby league props
Newtown Jets players
Rugby league players from South Australia